Lake Moondarra is an artificial lake on the Leichhardt River in Queensland, Australia, 16 km downstream from the town of Mount Isa. It provides water to the city and the adjacent Mount Isa Mines (MIM) mining lease.

Construction began on the Leichhardt Dam in 1956, and was completed on 6 November 1958 at a cost of £1.7 million. The dam was built for Mount Isa Mines and, at the time, was the largest water scheme in Australia financed by private enterprise. The original construction was started by the American Utah Construction Company, but Thiess Brothers completed the project.

On 11 July 1961 the dam officially became Lake Moondarra after a competition to name the dam was won by a Mount Isa local, Danny Driscoll. The Aboriginal name means "plenty of rain also thunder".

The lake includes picnic areas, pontoons, a ski jump, and water sports facilities. The lake is popular with birdwatchers, sailors and anglers, as it is stocked with barramundi and sooty grunter. The Lake Moondarra Fishing Classic has been held there since 1999.

Transport Bay was so named because tonnes of sand was deposited on the banks of the lake by MIM trucks to create a beach.

The lake was the location for one of Australia's largest stone axe quarries.  The axes were traded amongst Aborigines across distances as far as 1,000 km.

Pest weed control
In 1984, a species of weevil was successfully used as a biological pest control to contain a proliferation of the weed Salvinia molesta in the lake.  The first releases were made in 1980.  The weevil destroyed tens of thousands of tonnes of weed.

See also

East Leichhardt Dam
Lake Julius
List of reservoirs and dams in Australia
Rifle Creek Dam

References

North West Queensland
1958 establishments in Australia
Reservoirs in Queensland